The 1997 Louisville Cardinals football team represented the University of Louisville in the 1997 NCAA Division I-A football season. The team played their home games in Cardinal Stadium and was led by head coach by Ron Cooper.  It was the team's final season at the old Cardinal Stadium, before moving their home games to Cardinal Stadium.

Schedule

Team players in the NFL

Awards and honors
1997 Johnny Unitas Golden Arm Walk-On Player of the Year (Frank Camp Chapter)- Chris Scott

References

Louisville
Louisville Cardinals football seasons
Louisville Cardinals football